is a Japanese Zen Buddhist proverb. It is thought to be Yunmen Wenyan's answer in the sixth case of the kōan collection Blue Cliff Record. It has been presented by some Zen masters (notably, Kōdō Sawaki and his disciple Taisen Deshimaru). It was a favorite saying of the avant-garde composer John Cage, featured in Song Books (1970) as "Solo for Voice 64". 

Readings

 literally translates to "every day is a good day", or "try to spend every day meaningfully".

References

Zen
Japanese proverbs